The Puerto Rico national badminton team represents Puerto Rico in international badminton team competitions. It is controlled by the Badminton Federation of Puerto Rico (Spanish: Federación de Bádminton de Puerto Rico). The small island territory of Puerto Rico competed in the Pan American Badminton Championships.

The men's and women's team competed in 2010 and 2012. The men's team were eliminated in the group stage in the 2012 Pan Am Badminton Championships while the women's team achieved 5th place.

Participation in Pan American Badminton Championships

Men's team

Women's team

Current squad 

Men
Joshua Soler Román
Luis Pérez Justiniano
Pedro Zapata
Raynaldo Vargas Carmenatty
Roman Alejandro

Women
Genesis Valentin
Saribel Cáceres
Vitmary Rivera Rodriguez
Yuneyshka Guzmán Rosa

References

Badminton
National badminton teams
Badminton in Puerto Rico